Melvin Landerneau (born 29 September 1997) is a French racing cyclist. He rode in the men's sprint event at the 2018 UCI Track Cycling World Championships.

References

1997 births
Living people
French male cyclists
Place of birth missing (living people)
21st-century French people